Hubert Stanley Martin  (1879 – 17 November 1938) was a British diplomat, an early Boy Scout leader, The Boy Scouts Association of the United Kingdom International Commissioner and the Boy Scouts International Bureau's first director, from 1920 until his death in 1938.

Life and career 
Martin was employed by the British Foreign Office in 1898, serving as a King's messenger. He was made Chief Passport Officer in 1916. He was appointed as an officer of the Order of the British Empire (OBE) in 1918 and, in 1920, as a Commander (CBE). for his service during World War I. 

Martin formed a Boy Scout troop in London in 1909. He later became an official in The Boy Scouts Association. Martin maintained an independence from and, at times, uneasy relationship with Robert Baden-Powell. He was one of The Boy Scouts Association instructors at the first Wood Badge course held at Gilwell Park, from 8 to 19 September 1919. In 1920, while serving as The Boy Scout Association's International Commissioner, Martin also became the Boy Scouts International Bureau's first director, initially Honorary Director. He established the Bureau's first office at 25 Buckingham Palace Road, London. In late 1923, he verified the French Scouting camp schools of Cappy and Chamarande. In 1937, Martin was awarded the International Committee of the Boy Scout Movement's third Bronze Wolf for exceptional services to world Scouting.

Martin was appointed a Commander of the Royal Victorian Order (CVO) in 1934.

Works 
Scouting in Other Lands, 1926

See also 

World Scout Committee

References

External links 
Scoutbase.org.uk
Woodbadge.org

Bibliography 
 

1879 births
1938 deaths
British civil servants
International Scouting leaders
The Scout Association
Scouting pioneers
Commanders of the Royal Victorian Order
Officers of the Order of the British Empire
Fellows of the Zoological Society of London
Recipients of the Bronze Wolf Award